Jackson v Horizon Holidays Ltd [1975] 1 WLR 1468 is an English contract law case, concerning the doctrine of Privity. The case would now be partly resolved by the Contracts (Rights of Third Parties) Act 1999 section 1(1)(b), allowing a third party to claim independently. Some of the reasoning of Lord Denning MR was disapproved in Woodar Investment Development Ltd v Wimpey Construction UK Ltd, which held that the decision is limited to a confined category of cases involving consumers.

Facts
Mr Jackson got a holiday through Horizon Holidays Ltd to the Brown Beach Hotel, Hendala Point, in Ceylon (now Sri Lanka) for himself and his family. He paid £1200. When they arrived, the facilities were substandard, and not at all as promised. As Lord Denning MR recounted,

The judge followed Jarvis v Swans Tours Ltd and awarded damages of £1100 for distress. The defendant appealed against the damages awarded to Mr Jackson's wife and children, who were not parties to the contract.

Judgment
Lord Denning MR held that Mr Jackson could recover damages of £600 for defective performance and £500 for disappointment or ‘mental distress’ for himself and his family.

Lord Denning MR also held that the family might even, if desired, be joined as plaintiffs, that the initial award of £1100 was ‘about right’, and opined that other instances where a good claim may exist include a vicar contracting for a coach trip for the choir and a host booking a restaurant dinner for himself and his friends.

James LJ and Orr LJ concurred with Denning LJ's judgement, without adding further comments.

See also

English contract law

Notes

English contract case law
Court of Appeal (England and Wales) cases
1974 in case law
1974 in British law
Lord Denning cases